Anton Heimerl (15 February 1857, Budapest - 4 March 1943, Wien) was an Austrian botanist.

Heimerl specialized in research of the plant family Nyctaginaceae, and was the binomial authority of many botanical species. He was author of the sections on Nyctaginaceae, Phytolaccaceae and Achatocarpaceae in Engler & Prantl's "Die Natürlichen Pflanzenfamilien" (Volume 16, 1934).

In 1903 the genus Heimerlia was named after him by Franz Xaver Rudolf von Höhnel, and in 1941 Carl Skottsberg named the genus Heimerliodendron in his honor.

Selected writings 
 In English:
 "Two new species of Abronia", 1910
 "Nyctaginaceae of southeastern Polynesia and other Pacific islands", 1937
 In German:
 Die niederösterreichischen Ascoboleen, 1889
 Monographie der Nyctaginaceen. I. Bougainvillea, Phaeoptilum, Colignonia, 1900
 Flora von Brixen a. E.., 1911
 Schulflora fur Österreich und die angrenzenden Gebiete der Alpen- und Sudetenländer sowie des Küstenland südlich bis Triest, 1923.

References 

1857 births
1943 deaths
Scientists from Budapest
20th-century Austrian botanists
19th-century Austrian botanists